Al Huda School is a private Islamic school located in College Park, Maryland. It first opened in September 1995 with elementary students in Kindergarten through second grade. In Fall 2007, the high school opened. Currently, it has grades K-12, with boys and girls in separate classes.  it had over 700 students in all programs, with 460 students in its day school.

In 2013 the school and its affiliated mosque planned a new campus in the former Woodmont Academy in Cooksville, Western Howard County. Several area residents objected to the redevelopment plan proposed to the county government on the grounds that it would interfere with the area's rural character. In 2013, former James N. Robey aide Sang Oh representing Dar-us-Salaam, an Islamic organization that operates Al Huda, petitioned Howard County to rezone the Woodmont Property. The zoning application was dropped, but plans to move the Dar-us-Salaam facility from College Park to Cooksville proceeded as a conditional use.

See also
 Islam in Maryland

References

External links
 Dar-us-Salaam/Al Huda School
 BA 13-033C AL-HUDA, INC. t/a DAR-US-SALAAM September 30, 2014 Banneker Room - Howard County
 IN THE MATTER OF AL HUDA, INC., T/A DAR-US-SALAAM Petitioner BEFORE THE  : HOWARD COUNTY BOARD OF APPEALS HEARING EXAMINER BA Case No. 13-033C

Islamic schools in the United States
Private K-12 schools in Maryland
Religious schools in Maryland
Schools in Prince George's County, Maryland
College Park, Maryland
1995 establishments in Maryland
Educational institutions established in 1995
Islam in Maryland